Weightlifting Federation of the Republic of Kazakhstan (WFRK) (Qazaqstan Respýblıkasynyń aýyr atletıka federatsııasy) is the governing body for the sport of weightlifting in Kazakhstan.

History
Officially, the development of weightlifting in Kazakhstan begins in 1935. The first Republican championship held in 1937. In 1954, became the starting point for Kazakh weightlifters in the direction of establishing global and all-Union records.

References

External links
 

Kazakhstan
Federation
Weightlifting
Organizations based in Almaty
Sports organizations established in 1935